Beth Riggle is an American Paralympic swimmer.

Biography
Riggle participated in the 2004 Summer Paralympics in Athens, Greece where she won one gold and one bronze medal for her competition in 4x100 34 pt medley relay and 100m breaststroke swimming.

References

Paralympic swimmers of the United States
Medalists at the 2004 Summer Paralympics
Paralympic bronze medalists for the United States
Paralympic gold medalists for the United States
Swimmers at the 2004 Summer Paralympics
American female breaststroke swimmers
Living people
Year of birth missing (living people)
American sportswomen
Place of birth missing (living people)
Paralympic medalists in swimming
21st-century American women
S8-classified Paralympic swimmers